Arnfinn Engerbakk (born 22 March 1964) is a retired Norwegian football midfielder. He represented the Norway national team on four occasions in 1987.

He started his career in Nordre Trysil IL, and signed for Kongsvinger IL just after the 1985 season. He was ever-present in the Norwegian Premier League in his first season, and became a club legend. By late 1997 he had played in every position except for goalkeeper, and therefore got to tend the goal for a few minutes during his final home match. He did not concede any goals. He retired after the season.

In 1999, he made a comeback for the newly established, low-level club Vinger FK. He has later coached Raumnes & Årnes IL.

References

External links 
 

1964 births
Living people
Norwegian footballers
Kongsvinger IL Toppfotball players
People from Hedmark
Norwegian football managers
Eliteserien players
Association football midfielders
Norway international footballers
Sportspeople from Innlandet